Urvesh Patel (born 21 January 1988) is an Indian cricketer. He made his first-class debut for Vidarbha in the 2012–13 Ranji Trophy on 24 November 2012.

References

External links
 

1988 births
Living people
Indian cricketers
Vidarbha cricketers
Cricketers from Maharashtra